Boaz ben Jehoshaphat (Hebrew: בעז בן יהושפט) was the son of Jehoshaphat ben Saul and the great-grandson of Anan ben David. He lived in Iraq during the mid ninth century. As the direct lineal heir of Anan, Boaz was nasi and resh galuta of the Karaite Jews. He was the father of David ben Boaz.

Karaite rabbis
Karaite exilarchs
9th-century rabbis
Year of death unknown
Jewish royalty
Year of birth unknown